Jesús Yair Urbina Núñez (born 3 March 1983) is a Mexican former professional footballer who played as a goalkeeper.

References

External links
 
 Jesús Yair Urbina Núñez at Ascenso MX 

1983 births
Living people
Mexican footballers
Mexico under-20 international footballers
Liga MX players
Tigres UANL footballers
Correcaminos UAT footballers
C.D. Veracruz footballers
Atlético Morelia players
Club León footballers
Association football goalkeepers